McCausland (Mac Ausaláin in Gaelic), meaning "Son of Absolom" is a surname of Irish origin; there is also a clan of this name in Scotland. The family claim descent from the Cenel Eoghain race in County Londonderry and Tyrone, a branch of the Ui Neil.

Alternatively, the surname may be an Anglicization from a Gaelic name, as was the case with many Irish surnames, changing to sound more English over the centuries. The surname "Mac Ausaláin" may have an underlying Gaelic personal name, possibly Caisealán, meaning 'little one of the castle'.

Notable people
Notable people with the surname include:

 Charles McCausland (1898–1965), Irish cricketer
 Richard Bolton McCausland (1810–1900) Attorney-General of Singapore, and his son of the same name (1864-1933), a notable surgeon. 
 Chris McCausland (born 1977), British stand-up comedian
 Edward McCausland (1865–1936), Australian rugby player and cricketer
 Ernesto McCausland (1961–2012), Colombian journalist and filmmaker
 Gary McCausland (born 1968), Northern Irish television presenter and property developer
 John McCausland (1836–1927), Confederate general in the American Civil War
 John McCausland (politician) (1735–1804), Irish Member of Parliament for Donegal County
 Maurice McCausland (1872–1938), Irish landowner and political figure
 Nelson McCausland (born 1951), minister in the Northern Ireland Assembly
 Roberto McCausland Dieppa, Colombian pianist, composer, and conductor

References

See also
 McCausland, Iowa, city in Scott County, Iowa

Surnames of Irish origin
Anglicised Irish-language surnames